The 1991–92 Karlsruher SC season was the 97th season in the club's history and the 5th consecutive season playing in the Bundesliga since promotion from 2. Bundesliga in 1987. Karlsruher SC finished eight in the league.

The club also participated in the DFB-Pokal where it reached the quarter-finals, losing against Hannover 96.

Competitions

Overview

Bundesliga

DFB Pokal

Statistics

Squad statistics

|}

References

Karlsruher SC seasons
Karlsruher